Ansell's mole-rat (Fukomys anselli) is a species of rodent in the family Bathyergidae. It is endemic to Zambia. Its natural habitats are moist savanna and miombo forests. The colonies are made of an eusocial system. They include a main reproductive king and queen that are thought to be faithful to one another.

References

Woods, C. A. and C. W. Kilpatrick. 2005.  pp 1538–1600 in Mammal Species of the World a Taxonomic and Geographic Reference 3rd ed. D. E. Wilson and D. M. Reeder eds. Smithsonian Institution Press, Washington D.C.

Fukomys
Mammals of Zambia
Endemic fauna of Zambia
Mammals described in 1999
Taxonomy articles created by Polbot